Market (시장 - Shijang) is a 1965 South Korean film directed by Lee Man-hee. It was awarded Best Film at the Blue Dragon Film Awards.

Plot
Bok-nyeo, a mentally handicapped woman, supports her lazy husband by selling apples at the public marketplace. When her husband abandons her for another woman, another man who sympathizes with Bok-nyeo, kills him.

Cast
 Shin Young-kyun
 Moon Jung-suk
 Kim Seung-ho
 Heo Jang-kang

Bibliography

English

Korean

Notes

1965 films
Best Picture Blue Dragon Film Award winners
1960s Korean-language films
South Korean drama films
Films directed by Lee Man-hee (director)
1965 drama films